Clare Seo or Seo Hee-won (Hangul: 서희원; born 17 October 2006) is a Korean-American figure skater. Competing for the United States, she is the 2021 JGP France I bronze medalist and the 2022 U.S. junior national champion. She has placed within the top ten at two World Junior Championships, finishing sixth in 2022 and eighth in 2023.

Seo is also the 2020 South Korean junior national champion.

Personal life 
Seo was born on 17 October 2006 in Claremont, California, to Korean parents who were studying in the United States at the time. The family returned to South Korea when Seo was five years old and remained there until 2020, after which Seo moved back to the U.S. with her mother and her younger sister, Clara. As of 2022, she is a student at Cheyenne Mountain High School in Colorado Springs, Colorado. She intends to pursue a career in sports psychology once she retires from competitive skating.

Career

Early years 
Seo began learning to skate in 2010. She won gold in the junior women's event at the 2020 South Korean Championships. She was the junior women's bronze medalist at the 2021 U.S. Championships.

2021–22 season: U.S. junior national champion 
Seo made her junior international debut on the ISU Junior Grand Prix circuit in August at the 2021 JGP France I, the first of two JGP events held in Courchevel, France. She placed first in the short program, but fell to fourth in the free skate to finish third overall behind compatriot Lindsay Thorngren and Canadian competitor Kaiya Ruiter. At her second JGP assignment, the 2021 JGP Poland held in September, Seo was third in the short program and, again, fourth in the free skate to finish just off the podium in fourth overall.

Seo did not compete again until January, when she won the junior national title at the 2022 U.S. Figure Skating Championships, besting domestic rivals Ava Ziegler, Josephine Lee, and Katie Shen. Due to her placement at junior nationals, Seo was named to the American team for the 2022 World Junior Figure Skating Championships alongside Isabeau Levito and Lindsay Thorngren, both of whom competed at the senior level at nationals.

At Junior Worlds in April, Seo was 10th in the short program, but climbed to fifth in the free skate to finish sixth overall.

2022–23 season 
Seo opened her season back in Courchevel, France at the 2022 JGP France in late August. She placed fifth in both the short program and free skating segments of the competition, and finished fifth overall. At Seo's second Grand Prix event, 2022 JGP Poland, she finished in eighth place after placing tenth in the short program and ninth in the free skate.

Making her international senior debut at the 2022 CS Ice Challenge, Seo finished sixteenth in the short program after falling on two jump elements, but rebounded with a fourth-place free skate and finished eighth overall. Also competing as a senior, she finished seventh at the 2023 U.S. Championships. She was assigned to the 2023 World Junior Championships in Calgary, where she placed eighth.

Programs

Competitive highlights 
CS: Challenger Series; JGP: Junior Grand Prix.

For the United States

For South Korea

References

External links 
 

Living people
2006 births
American figure skaters
Korean figure skaters
American sportspeople of Korean descent
Sportspeople from California